Valentina Espinosa Guzmán (born 17 January 1998) is a Colombian model, social communicator and the winner of Señorita Colombia 2021.

Early life 
Valentina was born in Cartagena de Indias, Colombia, on 17 January 1998. Espinosa completed her high school at Aspaen Cartagena de Indias. She also graduated as a social communicator and journalist from the Universidad del Norte, located in the city of Barranquilla.

Pageantry

Señorita Bolívar 2021 
Valentina Espinosa began her career as a beauty queen in 2021, when she received the title of Señorita Bolívar, thus gaining the responsibility of representing her department in the Miss Colombia pageant, which would be held in November of the same year.

Señorita Colombia 2021 
In the city of Cartagena de Indias, during November 2021, the competition began to choose the new Miss Colombia, who would become the successor of María Fernanda Aristizábal in the challenges leading up to the final night, Valentina was widely favoured by the audience, and was also a finalist in the competition for the Belleza Integral award.

On the 14th of November the election and coronation evening was held, in which Valentina managed to stand out to the point of reaching the top final of the contest. At the end of the night, she was crowned Miss Colombia 2021, becoming the seventh woman from Bolívar department to win this recognition, after Natalia Navarro was the last representative of the department to achieve it, during the 2009 edition.

Miss Supranational 2022 
Among her commitments as queen of the Colombians, she is set to participate in the Miss Supranational 2022 pageant, so she will travel this year to Poland to represent her country. Valentina competed with the other 69 countries, by the end of the event, She ended up at Top 12. also obtaining the sash of Miss Supranational Americas.

References

External links

Colombian female models
1998 births
Living people
People from Cartagena, Colombia
Colombian beauty pageant winners